Frontino is a comune (municipality) in the Province of Pesaro e Urbino in the Italian region Marche.

Frontino borders the following municipalities: Carpegna, Piandimeleto, and Pietrarubbia.

References

Cities and towns in the Marche